Hobson Block is a historic building in West Union, Iowa, United States. The brick and stone building was designed by local architect Edward Easton in the Late Victorian style to rebuild the town after its original wooden structures were destroyed by fire in May 1885. It was individually listed on the National Register of Historic Places in 2008. In 2015 it was included as a contributing property in the West Union Commercial Historic District.

See also
 National Register of Historic Places listings in Fayette County, Iowa

References

Commercial buildings completed in 1885
Victorian architecture in Iowa
Commercial buildings on the National Register of Historic Places in Iowa
Buildings and structures in Fayette County, Iowa
National Register of Historic Places in Fayette County, Iowa
West Union, Iowa
1885 establishments in Iowa
Individually listed contributing properties to historic districts on the National Register in Iowa